Lucas Msomba (born 15 May 1954) is a Tanzanian boxer. He competed in the men's welterweight event at the 1980 Summer Olympics. Msomba won a bronze medal in the light-welterweight category at the 1978 All-Africa Games.

Career highlights
 TSC Tournament (63,5 kg), East Berlin, East Germany, October 1977:
1/2: Lost to Günther Lieser (East Germany) by decision
Commonwealth Games (67 kg), Edmonton, Canada, August 1978:
1/4: Lost to John Raftery (Canada) by decision
Olympic Games (67 kg), Moscow, Soviet Union, July-August 1980:
1/16: Defeated Elio Diaz (Venezuela) by majority decision, 4–1
1/8: Lost to Karl-Heinz Krüger (East Germany) by unanimous decision, 0–5
Commonwealth Games (71 kg), Brisbane, Australia, October 1982:
1/8: Lost to Nicholas Croombes (United Kingdom) by decision

References

1954 births
Living people
Tanzanian male boxers
Olympic boxers of Tanzania
Boxers at the 1980 Summer Olympics
Commonwealth Games competitors for Tanzania
Boxers at the 1978 Commonwealth Games
Boxers at the 1982 Commonwealth Games
African Games bronze medalists for Tanzania
African Games medalists in boxing
Place of birth missing (living people)
Competitors at the 1978 All-Africa Games
Welterweight boxers